Zhushan District is a district of the city of Jingdezhen, Jiangxi province, China.

Administrative divisions
Zhushan District has 9 subdistricts.
9 subdistricts

References

Administrative subdivisions of Jiangxi